Kayuadi Island (Id:Pulau Kayuadi) is an island in the Selayar Islands of South Sulawesi, Indonesia. Most people on the island speak Selayar. The island's economy is based around agriculture, with cassava and banana being major crops. As of 1998, the harvesting of sea cucumbers (tripang) was a major occupation. Kayuadi is one of the few islands home to a smaller subspecies of reticulated python.

References 

Islands of Indonesia